is a Japanese company that gathers and analyzes data from the digital entertainment industry, specifically focusing on the Japanese console gaming market. Business operations include publishing, market research and consulting. It is a popular website for people interested in learning the latest video game software and hardware sales figures from Japan. The company publishes "The Annual Game Industry Report" every year.

Weekly sales figures 
On Fridays (Japan Standard Time), the official Japanese website is updated with the top fifty selling video games of the previous week, as well as hardware sales figures for the Nintendo Switch, Nintendo DS, Nintendo DS Lite, Wii, PlayStation 5, PlayStation 4, PlayStation 3, PlayStation Portable, PlayStation 2, GameCube, Game Boy Advance, Game Boy Advance SP, Game Boy Micro, Xbox Series X/S, Xbox, and Xbox 360. Sales numbers are only provided for the top twenty games on the list, but figures exist for the rest of the games on the list and beyond; they must be paid for and subscribed to. The English website only posts the placement rankings of games and the percentage ranking of hardware.

Competition 
Media Create competes with Enterbrain's Famitsu and MediaWorks' Dengeki PlayStation in the market for providing Japanese game sales data. Because there are three different tracking firms, there will always be three different sales numbers for any software and hardware title. Which company to trust is a matter of debate, as none of the three major trackers are ever 100% accurate and whoever tracks the highest amount of sales for a given title fluctuates.

Nintendo cites Media Create sales data during its conferences and presentations.

References

External links 
  
  

Information technology companies of Japan
Research and analysis firms
Video game news websites
Video gaming in Japan
Companies with year of establishment missing